Andrea Giles Rich is an American television soap opera director.

Directing Credits

All My Children
 Occasional Director (2002–2003)

As the World Turns
 Occasional Director (2001–2003)
 Associate Director (Late 1990s)

Guiding Light
 Associate Director (1996–2009)

One Life to Live
 Associate Director (1987–1993)

Awards and nominations
Daytime Emmy Award
Win, 2007, Directing, Guiding Light
Nomination, 1988–1989, Directing, One Life to Live

External links

American television directors
American women television directors
Living people
Place of birth missing (living people)
Year of birth missing (living people)